Bungarus slowinskii, the Red River krait,  is a species of venomous snake in the family Elapidae. The species is endemic to mainland Southeast Asia

Taxonomy
Ulrich Kuch and colleagues described the species in 2005. The specific name, slowinskii, honors Joseph Bruno Slowinski, an American herpetologist who died from a krait bite at age 38.

Description
B. slowinskii has a color pattern of alternating wide black rings and narrow white rings on its body and tail.  The dorsal scales are arranged in 15 rows at midbody. The dorsal scales in the vertebral row are enlarged and hexagonal. The subcaudal scales are divided.

Distribution and habitat
B. slowinskii is currently known from Vietnam, northeastern Thailand,  and Laos.

Reproduction
B. slowinskii is oviparous.

References

Further reading
Kharin, Vladimir E.; Orlov, Nikolai L.; Ananjeva, Natalia B. (2011). "New Records and Redescription of Rare and Little-Known Elapid Snake Bungarus slowinskii (Serpentes: Elapidae: Bungarinae)". Russian Journal of Herpetology 18 (4): 284–294.

slowinskii
Snakes of Asia
Reptiles of Laos
Reptiles of Thailand
Snakes of Vietnam
Reptiles described in 2005
Taxa named by Maureen Ann Donnelly